Insidetrak is an employment website for job listings (thus also an example of vertical search) and online recruitment advertising network. The company aggregates job listings from job boards and company career sites in Australia and match them against a proprietary database of workplace reviews. The company intend to match job opportunity and insight information on the company advertising the job. A review process and technological solutions have been implemented to ensure reviews adhere to the community guidelines

Job advertisement is free in the site. The revenue model is currently undetermined with only one allusive sentence related to a-la-carte performance enhancement (advertising in a pay-per-click (PPC) model is the most likely interpretation).

Insidetrak currently operates job search engine only in Australia. Insidetrak is a local copy of the popular U.S. website glassdoor.com.

Like its American peers, Insidetrak is considered a minetent placed on their site.

See also 
 News Limited
 Employment website

References

External links
Insidetrak Company Blog

Internet properties established in 2012
Employment websites